John Lyman is the name of:

 John Lyman (athlete) (1912–1989), American shot putter
 John Lyman (American football) (?–?), American collegiate football coach
 John Goodwin Lyman (1886–1967), American-Canadian painter

See also 
 Lyman (disambiguation)